Jérémy Chardy and Łukasz Kubot were the defending champions, but decided not to participate.
Facundo Bagnis and Thomaz Bellucci won the title, defeating Tomasz Bednarek and Mateusz Kowalczyk in the final, 2–6, 6–4, [11–9].

Seeds

Draw

Draw

References

External links
 Main draw

Stuttgart Open - Doubles
Doubles 2013